Houttuin is a resort in Suriname, located in the Wanica District.  Its population at the 2012 census was 15,656. The largest ethnic group are the Indo-Surinamese. The resort is named after the sugar plantation Houttuyn which was founded in 1737. The resort was mainly agricultural, and is planned to remain an agricultural centre. In the early 21st century, it has seen a steady population growth, and is becoming suburban with housing projects like .

Staatsolie is operating an oil refinery, and a thermal power plant in Houttuin.

References

Resorts of Suriname
Populated places in Wanica District